Mateo Blanco (born 1981, Miami) is an American 2D and 3D artist. Blanco uses non-conventional items to create art. Many of Mateo's creations are acquired by Ripley's Believe It or Not. Mateo lives in Orlando, Florida and is also an American tenor. He recorded an album titled Mateo Blanco 7:24.

Early life and education 
Mateo Blanco commenced his formal training under the supervision of Débora Arango in Medellin, Colombia. He studied with Arturo Estrada Hernández and Lola Vélez. Further, Mateo studied Goldsmithing and Jewelry in Medellin, Colombia and studied commercial music at Florida Atlantic University. Mateo received a training on classical opera singing, performed in La traviata , Rigoletto, Don Giovanni and Il Trovatore. Blanco was a part of Opera Blanca de Colombia. Blanco has also make presentations accompanied by Aretha Franklin and  performed for former president George H. W. Bush at his birthday dinner.

Key Art-Works 
 A 78X55 inches Jennifer Lawrence's portrait with 9,658 Planters peanuts
 A portrait of Tennessee native Dolly Parton made of piece of clothes without paint
 A series, “Joseph, Coat of Many Colors”, as an honor to Jewish history
 Cheetah sculptures made from Cheetos Puffs
 Portraits of singer Madonna, with wooden slits carved over her image for a 2D effect
 A 3D replica of a FedEx truck with dog hair
 A 3D sculpture of Sofía Vergara using feathers

References 

Living people
American sculptors
People from Orlando, Florida
American tenors
Ripley's Believe It or Not!
1981 births